Ålvik Church is a parish church of the Church of Norway in Kvam Municipality in Vestland county, Norway. It is located in the village of Ålvik. It is the church for the Ålvik parish which is part of the Hardanger og Voss prosti (deanery) in the Diocese of Bjørgvin. The brick church was built in a rectangular design in 1962 using plans drawn up by the architect Esben Poulsson. The church seats about 280 people.

History
The village of Ålvik grew up as an industrial site during the early 20th century. By the 1960s, the area received permission to build a church. Esben Poulsson, an architect from Oslo, was hired to design the new church. The walls are red brick that is painted white on the exterior. Off the northeast side of the church is a small extension that contains offices, bathroom, and a sacristy. The church was consecrated on 15 April 1962.

See also
List of churches in Bjørgvin

References

Kvam
Churches in Vestland
Rectangular churches in Norway
Brick churches in Norway
20th-century Church of Norway church buildings
Churches completed in 1962
1962 establishments in Norway